Mavacoxib (trade name Trocoxil) is a veterinary drug used to treat pain and inflammation in dogs with degenerative joint
disease.  It acts as a COX-2 inhibitor.

Mavacoxib, along with other COX-2 selective inhibitors, celecoxib, valdecoxib, and parecoxib, were discovered by a team at the Searle division of Monsanto led by John Talley.

References 

COX-2 inhibitors
Nonsteroidal anti-inflammatory drugs
Fluoroarenes
Sulfonamides 
Pyrazoles
Trifluoromethyl compounds